Livable South Holland (Leefbaar Zuid-Holland) was a Dutch provincial-level political party, whose aim was to represent the many local-level parties in provincial-level politics in the province of South Holland.  The party's only representative was Lenneke van der Meer from the 2003 elections until 2007. She was the party's fractievoorzitter. From 2007 to 2011, Ronald Sørensen was the party leader and represented the party in provincial politics.

Livable South Holland dissolved in 2010.

See also
Similarly named parties:

 Provincial level:
Livable Brabant/BOF
 Local level:
Livable Almelo
Livable Almere
Livable Amsterdam
Livable Den Haag
Livable Eindhoven
Livable Hilversum
Livable Rotterdam
Livable Tynaarlo
Livable Utrecht
 (Supra)national level:
Livable Europa
Livable Nederland

External links
Party website

Defunct political parties in the Netherlands
Regionalist parties in the Netherlands
Politics of South Holland